Mauricio Geraldiny Morales Olivares (born 7 January 2000), also known as Mauro Morales, is a Chilean professional footballer who plays as a central midfielder for Chilean Primera División club Universidad de Chile.

Club career
Morales made his professional debut in a Copa Chile match against Cobresal on 7 September 2019. On 21 December, he signed his first contract as a professional footballer. Morales made his international club debut in a Copa Libertadores match against San Lorenzo de Almagro on 18 March 2021.

International career
At early age, he represented Chile at under-15 level at the 2015 South American U-15 Championship and winning the friendly 2015 Aspire Tri-Series International Tournament in Doha, Qatar. Later, he represented the under-17 team in two friendly matches against the United States, at the 2017 South American U-17 Championship – where Chile finished runners-up – and at the 2017 FIFA U-17 World Cup.

He played all the matches for the under-17s at the friendly tournament, the 2017 Lafarge Foot Avenir in France, better known as Tournament Limoges, which Chile won after defeating Belgium and Poland, and drawing to France.

Honours
Chile U15
 Aspire Tri-Series International Tournament: 2015

Chile U17
 Tournoi de Limoges: 2017

References

External links
 
 

Living people
2000 births
People from Choapa Province
Chilean footballers
Association football midfielders
Universidad de Chile footballers
Chilean Primera División players
Chile youth international footballers